Mihlali Mosi (born ) is a South African rugby union player for the . His regular position is flanker or number 8.

Mosi was named in the  squad for the 2021 Currie Cup Premier Division.

References

South African rugby union players
Living people
1996 births
Rugby union flankers
Rugby union number eights
Free State Cheetahs players
Border Bulldogs players
Cheetahs (rugby union) players
Rugby union players from the Eastern Cape
Bulls (rugby union) players
Blue Bulls players